is a Japanese writer. She has won the Japan Love Story Grand Prize, the Yamamoto Shūgorō Prize, and the Nitta Jiro Literature Prize, she has been nominated multiple times for the Naoki Prize, and several of her novels have been adapted for film and television.

Early life and education 
Harada was born in 1962 in Kodaira, Tokyo, Japan. Her father, a seller of art books and encyclopedias, moved the family to Okayama, where Harada experienced bullying from her school classmates and started writing stories to combat her isolation.  She graduated from high school in Okayama and entered Kwansei Gakuin University to study German literature, but later changed her focus and graduated with a degree in Japanese literature. After graduation she worked as a graphic designer and married her husband, then worked in a series of art direction and curation jobs, including five years at the Japanese conglomerate Itochu, while also attending graduate school in art history at Waseda University. Harada subsequently worked as an art curator for the Mori Art Museum, including a collaboration with the Museum of Modern Art, but left in 2002 to work as a freelance art curator.

Career 

Harada made her literary debut in her early 40s. Her first novel, won the inaugural Japan Love Story Grand Prize, awarded to a newcomer writing in the love story genre, and was published in 2006 by Takarajimasha, the prize's sponsor. It sold over 370,000 copies. The book was later adapted into a 2009 Yu Nakai film of the same name starring Maiko and Tetsuji Tamayama.

After her debut Harada wrote several more novels that were subsequently adapted for film and television. Her 2007 novel  was later adapted into 2014 film of the same name, made in Taiwan and released nationwide in Japan. Her 2010 novel , about a woman whose romantic setbacks lead her to success as a speechwriter, was later adapted into the 2017 Wowow TV drama starring Manami Higa and Kyoko Hasegawa. Her 2010 cell phone novel , about teenagers who organize a fashion show, was adapted into the 2011 Kentaro Otani film Runway Beat starring Nanami Sakuraba and Mirei Kiritani. Her 2011 novel , about a broken friendship between two high school girls living in Okayama in 1980 who meet again thirty years later, was later adapted into a 2015 Akiko Ohku film starring Rika Adachi and Mio Yūki.

In 2012 Shinchosha published Harada's novel , a story about a disgraced art curator asked to help with negotiations for a painting whose provenance she previously investigated. Rakuen no kanvasu won the 25th Yamamoto Shūgorō Prize. Later that year the book was nominated for the 147th Naoki Prize, but the prize went to Mizuki Tsujimura.

Harada was nominated twice more for the Naoki Prize without winning. In 2013 Harada's novel , a work of historical fiction that tells stories about French painters Claude Monet, Henri Matisse, Edgar Degas, and Paul Cézanne from the perspective of women in their lives, was nominated for the 149th Naoki Prize. Her 2016 suspense novel , a thriller about the return of Picasso's Guernica to the Museum of Modern Art that combines a fictionalized historical account of French photographer Dora Maar with an entirely fictional narrative about an art curator in New York City following the September 11 attacks, was nominated for the 155th Naoki Prize.

In 2017 Harada won the 36th Nitta Jiro Literature Prize for her 2016 novel , a work of historical fiction in which the main character, a bilingual orphaned Japanese teenage boy, becomes an accomplished potter under the tutelage of British ceramic artist Bernard Leach. In 2018 her book , a collection of linked stories about a neighborhood pastry shop, was published by Popurasha. The following year she received her fourth Naoki Prize nomination, for her novel .

Personal life 
Harada's brother is the novelist Munenori Harada.

Recognition 
 2005: 1st Japan Love Story Grand Prize
 2012: 25th Yamamoto Shūgorō Prize
 2017: 36th Nitta Jiro Literature Prize

Film and other adaptations

Film 
 , 2007
 , 2011
 , 2014
 , 2015

Television 
 , Wowow, 2017

Selected works 
 , Takarajimasha, 2006, 
 , Takarajimasha, 2007, 
 , Takarajimasha, 2010, 
 , Tokumashoten, 2010, 
 , Shōdensha, 2011, 
 , Shinchosha, 2012,  
 , Shueisha, 2013, 
 , Shinchosha, 2016, 
 , Shueisha, 2016, 
 , Popurasha, 2018, 
 , Bungeishunjū, 2019

References

1962 births
Living people
21st-century Japanese novelists
21st-century Japanese women writers
Japanese women novelists
Writers from Tokyo
People from Kodaira, Tokyo
Kwansei Gakuin University alumni
Waseda University alumni